Bomba are an Australian funk and reggae band from Melbourne. Led by Maltese-Australian Nicky Bomba, they are renowned internationally for their "energetic live shows and passionate performances", although they are more popular at home. They have released four albums, the latest of which is Bomba Vs. Laroz.

History
Bomba grew out of the band 'The Overtones' which formed in 1997. The line up of the Overtones, which subsequently became the original Bomba personnel, was Nicky Bomba on guitar, percussion and vocals; Simon Burke on keyboards; Paul Coyle on trumpet, flugelhorn, percussion and vocals; Barry Deenick on bass guitar and vocals; Mal Webb on trombone and vocals; Phil Bywater on alto and tenor saxophones and clarinet; and George Servanis on drums, percussion and vocals.  The group released Population in 2000. Australian music journalist, Ed Nimmervoll described the album as "delightfully eclectic, bridging the previously unrelated gap between reggae and big band music". Their second album, Solar Plexus, appeared on Transmitter Records in 2002. By about 2003, the line-up had settled as Nicky Bomba on guitar, theremin, percussion and vocals; his brother Michael Caruana on keyboards, percussion and vocals; Paul Coyle on trumpet, trombone, flugelhorn, percussion and vocals; Dorian West on bass guitar, trumpet, flugelhorn, guitar, theremin, percussion and vocals; Pete Mitchell on tenor and baritone saxophone, guitar, percussion and vocals; and George Servanis on drums, percussion and vocals. In 2005 they released their third album, Learn to Breathe.

The band
Bomba contains 6 members. They are:
Nicky Bomba: Guitar, Theremin, Percussion and vocals
Paul Coyle: Trumpet, Trombone, Flugelhorn, percussion and vocals
Dorian West: Bass, Trumpet, Flugelhorn, Guitar, Theremin, percussion and vocals
Pete Mitchell: Tenor, Baritone Saxophone, Guitar, percussion and vocals
George Servanis: drums, percussion and vocals
Michael Caruana: keyboards, percussion and vocals

Discography

Albums

References

External links 
 

Australian reggae musical groups